Detlef Krella (born 4 March 1964) is a retired German football midfielder.

References

External links
 

1964 births
Living people
German footballers
Bundesliga players
2. Bundesliga players
VfL Bochum players
1. FC Nürnberg players
Rot-Weiß Oberhausen players
Kickers Offenbach players
Alemannia Aachen players
Place of birth missing (living people)
Association football midfielders